Chinese sausage is a generic term referring to the many different types of sausages originating in China. The southern flavor of Chinese sausage is commonly known by its Cantonese name  (or ).

Varieties
There is a choice of fatty or lean sausages. There are different kinds ranging from those made using fresh pork to those made using pig livers, duck livers and even turkey livers.  Usually a sausage made with liver will be darker in color than one made without liver. Recently, there have even been countries producing chicken Chinese sausages.  Traditionally they are classified into two main types.  It is sometimes rolled and steamed in dim sum.

 Lap cheong (Cantonese, or ) is a dried, hard sausage usually made from pork and pork fat. It is normally smoked, sweetened, and seasoned with rose water, rice wine and soy sauce.
 Yun chang is made using duck liver.
 Xiang chang is a fresh and plump sausage consisting of coarsely chopped pieces of pork and un-rendered pork fat. The sausage is rather sweet in taste.
 Nuomi chang is a white-colored sausage consisting of glutinous rice and flavoring stuffed into a casing and then steamed or boiled until cooked. The nuomi chang of some Chinese cultures have blood as a binding agent similar to Korean sundae.
 Xue chang are Chinese sausages that have blood as the primary ingredient.
 Bairouxue chang is a type of sausage popular in northeast China that includes chopped meat in the blood mixture.
 Guan chang is a long, red sausage made of fresh meat.

Regional

Chinese sausage is used as an ingredient in quite a number of dishes in the southern Chinese provinces of Guangdong, Fujian, Jiangxi, Sichuan, and Hunan, and also Hong Kong, Taiwan. Sichuan sausage also contains red chili powder, Sichuan pepper powder, and Pixian bean sauce, to characterise the sausage with a special flavour. Two common examples of such dishes include fried rice and lo mai gai (糯米雞). The traditional unpackaged forms are usually found in street markets or wet markets.

Hongchang

In northeast China, especially Heilongjiang's largest city Harbin, Hongchang, a popular regional specialty, is smoked savory red sausage similar to Polish "country" kielbasa and Lithuanian skilandis, with a coarsely ground texture and more "European" flavours than other Chinese sausages. It was first manufactured in March 1909 by Lithuanian staff in a Russian-capitalized factory named Churin Sausage Factory, located in Harbin's Daoli District. An alternative name is Lidaosi, from Russian  kolbasa «litovskaâ», "Lithuanian sausage". Harbin-style sausage subsequently became popular in China, especially in northern regions. A sweeter dried version similar to southern Chinese sausages is also produced.

In Chinese, Hongchang may also refer to other red-colored sausages in China. This includes the Shanghai Big Hongchang, an adaptation of Falukorv. The aforementioned "Lidaosi" is used to unambiguously refer to the Harbin original in the language.

In other countries

Vietnam
It has been incorporated into a variety of dishes from simple omelets to more complex main courses. Due to the salty taste of the sausages, they are used in moderation with other ingredients to balance the flavor. The sausages are made from pork or chicken, the latter of which yields a leaner taste. Tung lò mò is a similar sausage made from beef by the Chams community in southern Vietnam.

Myanmar 
The sausages made in Myanmar are more meaty and compact compared to those in Singapore or China. They are usually used in fried rice and along with fried vegetables, mostly cabbage.

Philippines

In the Philippines, Chinese sausage is an ingredient in some Chinese-Filipino dishes like siopao bola-bola. It is sometimes confused with and used in place of the native sausage Chorizo de Macao (which is also sometimes known as "Chinese chorizo"). The latter is not derived from the Chinese sausage, but derives its name from the use of star anise, which is associated with Chinese cuisine in the Philippines.

Taiwan
Taiwan also produces a similar form of sausage; however, they are rarely dried in the manner of Cantonese sausages. The fat and meat may be emulsified, and a larger amount of sugar may be used, yielding a sweeter taste. These sausages are usually produced by local butchers and sold at markets or made at home.

Singapore
Singapore produces innovative Chinese sausages that could be considered healthier than the traditional variety. Examples include low-fat, low-sodium, and high-fibre Chinese sausages.

Thailand 

In Thai, Chinese sausage is called  after its name in the Teochew dialect (贯肠,  in Teochew), the dominant Chinese language within the Thai Chinese community.
There is also Chinese sausage made with snakehead fish.

Suriname
In Suriname, Chinese sausage is referred to by a Hakka Chinese word rendered as  fatjong, fachong,

fa-chong, fashong, or fasjong in colloquial spelling. It is part of the dish moksi meti tyawmin (mixed meat chow mein).

Other regions
Chinese sausages are generally available in Asian supermarkets outside Asia, mostly in a vacuum-packaged form, although some Chinese groceries sell the unpackaged varieties as well. These tend to be made domestically due to prohibitions on import of meat products from overseas. For example, many of the Chinese sausages sold in Canada are produced by a number of manufacturers based in Vancouver and Toronto. Lap cheong is also a very popular sausage in Hawaii due to large numbers of Chinese in Hawaii who have incorporated it into local cuisine.

See also

 Curing (food preservation)
 Ham sausage – a mass-produced sausage in China
 List of dried foods
 List of sausages
 List of sausage dishes
 List of smoked foods

References

Fermented sausages

Hong Kong cuisine
Malaysian cuisine
Singaporean cuisine
Taiwanese sausages
Burmese cuisine
Philippine cuisine
Thai cuisine
Vietnamese cuisine
Smoked meat